The Food, Beverages and Catering Union (NGG) is a trade union in Germany. It has a membership of 205,900 and is one of eight industrial affiliates of the German Confederation of Trade Unions.

Membership
Today, NGG mainly represents employees at major companies such as McDonald's, Nestlé and Unilever in Germany.

Presidents
1949: Gustav Pufal
1950: Ferdinand Warnecke
1951: Hans Nätscher
1962: Alfred Schattanik
1966: Herbert Stadelmaier
1978: Günter Döding
1989: Erich Herrmann
1990: Heinz-Günter Niebrügge
1992: Franz-Josef Möllenberg
2013: Michaela Rosenberger
2018: Guido Zeitler

Notable members
 Olaf Scholz – First Mayor of Hamburg

References

External links

www.ngg.net

German Trade Union Confederation
Food processing trade unions
Hospitality industry trade unions
Organisations based in Hamburg